Spruce Run may refer to: 

Spruce Run (Delaware County, Ohio)
Spruce Run Earthworks
Spruce Run (Buffalo Creek tributary), in Union County, Pennsylvania
Spruce Run (Little Fishing Creek tributary), in Columbia County, Pennsylvania
Spruce Run (Raritan River tributary), in Hunterdon County, New Jersey
Spruce Run, New Jersey, in Hunterdon County, New Jersey
Spruce Run Evangelical Lutheran Zion Church
Spruce Run Recreation Area, in Hunterdon County, New Jersey